The Sugar Swirl Stakes is a Grade III American Thoroughbred horse race for fillies and mares that are three years old or older, over a distance of 6 furlongs on the dirt track held annually in December at Gulfstream Park, Hallandale Beach, Florida.  The event currently carries a purse of $125,000.

History 
The event is named in honor of the Canadian bred mare Sugar Swirl who was owned by Stronach Stables. The Stronach Group are the owners of Gulfstream Park where this event is held.

The race was inaugurated in 1981 and the event was run as the First Lady Handicap. 
At that time the event was held in January and the conditions of the race were for fillies and mares that were four years old or older.

In 2008 Sugar Swirl won this event and in 2010 the event was renamed to the Sugar Swirl Stakes. The event was moved to December in 2011 and there were two runnings of the event that year.

Records

Speed record: 
 6 furlongs: 1:08.66 – Dust and Diamonds (2012)

Margins: 
  lengths – Lady's Island (2019)

Most wins:
 2 - Harmony Lodge  (2003, 2004)
 2 - Lady's Island (2019, 2020)

Most wins by a jockey
 6 – Javier Castellano (2006, 2008, 2011, 2013, 2014, 2018)
 6 – John R. Velazquez (2002, 2003, 2005, 2009, 2011, 2015)

Most wins by a trainer
 4 – Todd A. Pletcher (2003, 2004, 2009, 2012)

Most wins by an owner 
 2 – Edward P. Evans (1992, 2002)
 2 – Eugene & Laura Melnyk  (2003, 2004)
 2 – Matties Racing Stable & Averill Racing (2019, 2020)

Winners

Notes:

† Gulfstream Park administration moved the event to earlier in their 2011–12 meeting from January to December. Hence, there were two runnings of the event in the calendar year (2011)

See also
 List of American and Canadian Graded races

References

Horse races in the United States
Graded stakes races in the United States
1981 establishments in Florida
Recurring sporting events established in 1981
Horse races in Florida
Sprint category horse races for fillies and mares
Grade 3 stakes races in the United States